is a military aerodrome of the Japan Air Self-Defense Force.

In July 2021, Japan’s Defense Minister, Nobuo Kishi, announced that the base will host the F-35Bs of the JASDF. A total of 42 F-35B variants will be acquired, introducing 18 by FY2023, six in FY2024 and two in FY2025. These are to form a single squadron consisting of about 20 aircraft. The base is located in close proximity to the Japan Maritime Self Defense Force's Kure Base in Hiroshima Prefecture, which is the home port of JS Kaga, one of two Japanese carriers being converted to operate the F-35B.

Tenant squadrons
 305th Tactical Fighter Squadron (F-15J)
 Fighter Training Group
 23rd Flying Training Squadron (F-15J)
 Air Rescue Wing Nyutabaru Detachment (UH-60J & U-125A)

References

Japan Air Self-Defense Force bases
Buildings and structures in Miyazaki Prefecture
Military airbases established in 1940